Margarya bicostata is a species of large operculate freshwater snail, an aquatic gastropod mollusk in the family Viviparidae, the river snails.

Distribution 
The distribution of Margarya bicostata includes Fuxian Lake in Yunnan Province, China. Former distribution also included Dian Lake.

References

Viviparidae
Endemic fauna of Yunnan
Invertebrates of China